Events in the year 1875 in Norway.

Incumbents
Monarch: Oscar II

Events
 31 December – Population Census: 1,813,424 inhabitants in Norway.
 The Norwegian krone was introduced, replacing the Norwegian speciedaler.
 The Metric system was introduced and replaced the old measurement units (de jure).

Arts and literature
 The local newspaper Fædrelandsvennen was first published.

Births
27 January – Eilert Falch-Lund, sailor and Olympic gold medallist (died 1960)
6 February – Mads Gram, physician (died 1929)
28 March – Ragnhild Jølsen, author (died 1908)
9 April – Kristian Laake, Commanding General of the Norwegian Army 1931–1940 (died 1950)
22 April – Gustav Adolf Lammers Heiberg, barrister and politician (died 1948)
31 May – Helga Eng, psychologist and educationalist (died 1966).
15 June – Herman Smith-Johannsen, cross-country skier and supercentenarian (died 1987)
25 August – Agnes Mowinckel, actress and stage producer (died 1963).
12 November – Kristian Geelmuyden, politician (died 1969)
16 November – Johan Wollebæk, jurist and diplomat (died 1940)
17 November – Birger Eriksen, military officer (died 1958)
21 December – Halvor Møgster, sailor and Olympic gold medallist (died 1950)

Full date unknown
Torger Baardseth, bookseller and publisher (died 1947)
Jacob Gundersen, freestyle wrestler and Olympic silver medallist (died 1968)
Olav Gunnarsson Helland, Hardanger fiddle maker (died 1946)
Olaf Lange, painter and graphic designer (died 1965)
Niels Thorshaug, veterinarian (died 1942)
Jacob Vidnes, trade unionist, newspaper editor and politician (died 1940)
Emanuel Vigeland, artist (died 1948)

Deaths
13 June – Eilert Sundt, sociologist (born 1817)

Full date unknown
Hans Severin Arentz, politician (born 1806)
Hans Jensen Blom, politician (born 1812)
Ivar Christian Sommerschild Geelmuyden, politician (born 1819)
Ludvig Johan Carl Manthey, civil servant (born 1809)
Erik Røring Møinichen, politician and Minister (born 1797)
Ingebrigt Haldorsen Sæter, politician (born 1800)

See also

References